Tales of Rock'n'Roll is the twelfth full-length studio album recorded by the various M.S.G. lineups and
the ninth studio album by the Michael Schenker Group. It was released in 2006 after two years of work in celebration of  the band's 25th anniversary. The music was initially composed for a UFO concept album but Schenker decided instead to use it for a new MSG album after he reformed the band with a new line-up. Every lead singer from MSG's past incarnations contributed lyrics and vocals.

Track listing
All music by Michael Schenker, all lyrics by Jari Tiura, except where indicated

"The Ride" - 3:16 
"Setting Sun" - 3:44 
"Angel of Avalon" (Leif Sundin) - 2:21
"Dreams Inside" (Chris Logan) - 3:33
"Dust to Dust" - 3:28 
"Voice of My Heart" - 2:40 
"Journeyman" - 2:30 
"Big Deal (False Alarms)" (Kelly Keeling) - 2:59
"St. Ann" - 1:38 
"Shadow Lady" - 2:31 
"Love Trade" - 3:48 
"Human Child" - 2:58 
"Bittersweet" - 3:04 
"Blind Alley" - 2:44 
"Freedom" - 3:58 
"Life Vacation" (Gary Barden) - 2:53
"Rock 'n' Roll" (Graham Bonnet) - 3:42
"Tell a Story" (Robin McAuley) - 3:08
"Life Goes On" (instrumental) - 1:51
"Interview" (Austrian edition bonus track)

Personnel

Band members
Jari Tiura - vocals
Michael Schenker - guitars, producer
Wayne Findlay - keyboards, rhythm guitar, 7 string guitars, lead guitar trade off with Schenker on "Big Deal" and "Life Vacation"
Pete Way - bass
Jeff Martin - drums

Additional musicians
Gary Barden - vocals on "Life Vacation" Words and Melodies- Kelly Keeling 
Graham Bonnet - vocals on "Rock 'n' Roll"
Robin McAuley - vocals on "Tell a Story"
Kelly Keeling - vocals on "Big Deal" ( False Alarms ) words & melodies Kelt Keeling
Leif Sundin - vocals on "Angel of Avalon"
Chris Logan - vocals on "Dreams Inside"

Production
Ralph Patlan - engineer
Rick Plester - mixing, mastering

References

2006 albums
Michael Schenker Group albums